Megacraspedus majorella is a moth of the family Gelechiidae. It was described by Aristide Caradja in 1920. It is found in Russia's Alai Mountains.

Adults are nearly identical to Megacraspedus imparellus, but bigger and the two dots in the cell are further apart.

References

Moths described in 1920
Megacraspedus